The 2014 Shohada Cup was a friendly football tournament that took place in Tehran in the Iran in July 2014.

Participating teams
Totally 4 teams get permission to participate in the tournament "2014 Shohada Cup".
 Esteghlal from ( Iran)
 Malavan from ( Iran)
 Paykan from ( Iran)
 Tractor from ( Iran)

Matches

First round

Play-off

Final

Statistics

Top scorers

References

See also 
 2014–15 Iran Pro League
 2014–15 Hazfi Cup

Shohada
Iran